Merrill Keith Riddick (March 7, 1895 – March 9, 1988) was an American aviator and perennial candidate. He was a candidate for President of the United States three times, affiliated with Puritan Ethic and Epic, Magnetohydrodynamics and Prohibition Party, which he founded.

Early life
He was born on March 7, 1895, in Madison, Wisconsin. He moved to Eastern Montana at the age of 11. His father, Carl W. Riddick, served two terms as a member of the United States House of Representatives. His aunt, Florence Riddick Boys, was a writer and suffragette. At the age of 16, Riddick began traveling throughout the Northwest and became interested in the emerging field of aviation. In 1917, Riddick was a member of the first graduating class from the Army Air Force Aeronautics School in San Diego. He was sent to Europe during World War I to serve as an instructor and to fly reconnaissance.

Career 
After World War I, Riddick was among the first airmail pilots. Riddick and Charles A. Lindbergh barnstormed together and flew in the Harry Perkins Air Circus. While barnstorming, Riddick met and married his wife, Helen May Williams, from West Virginia. They had three children, Mary Ruth, Keith, and Barbara. In 1928, Riddick was an instructor at the first aviation preparatory school in Rochester, New York, where he instructed future president Franklin D. Roosevelt. Riddick re-joined the Air Force during World War II and served as a technical instructor. He was also a prospector who was involved in many different mining claims prior to and after the war

Riddick moved back to Montana after the war but continued traveling. After his wife's death in 1949, Riddick became involved in politics. He was a resident of Granite County during his political campaigns, which were centered on natural resource management and campaign finance reform. He wrote and published the Journal of Applied Human Ecology, which focused on his plans for resource development. He ran for the Democratic nomination for Montana governor in 1960 and 1968, U.S. Congress in 1972, and was a presidential candidate in 1976, 1980, and 1984. Riddick ran for his self-created political party, the Magneto-hydrodynamics-Puritan Epic-Prohibition Party, and did not accept campaign contributions. Riddick campaigned across the nation, traveling only by passenger bus. After his presidential campaigns Riddick moved to Annapolis, Maryland, and lived with his sister, Ruth.

Death 
Riddick died of cancer on March 9, 1988, in Annapolis, Maryland, two days after his 93rd birthday.

References

External links
Guide to the Merrill K. Riddick Papers at the Mike Mansfield Library at The University of Montana http://nwda-db.wsulibs.wsu.edu/findaid/ark:/80444/xv83451
FINAL FLIGHT - Reconstructing an Early Airmail Accident by Dave G. Stiff http://collections.mnhs.org/MNHistoryMagazine/articles/50/v50i03p099-104.pdf
 PILOT STORIES: Postal Museum http://www.postalmuseum.si.edu/AMS/pilot/pilot_rest/pilot_rest_riddick.html
 Montana Ghost Dance: Essays on Land and Life by John B. Wright

1895 births
1988 deaths
20th-century American politicians
Montana politicians
Candidates in the 1976 United States presidential election
Candidates in the 1980 United States presidential election
Candidates in the 1984 United States presidential election
Aviation pioneers
Barnstormers
United States airmail pilots
People from Granite County, Montana
People from Madison, Wisconsin